St. Joseph's College, Sasse (Sasse College or Republic of Sasse) is the first secondary school in the Cameroons. It is  secondary school in the Southwest Region of Cameroon, with its campus located in Sasse, Buea. It was created in 1939 by the Mill Hill Missionaries.

Affiliated with the Catholic faith as an all-male institution, it provides education at the first cycle and high school levels, offering programs in science and arts.
In 2012, Sasse college was awarded the prize of the best school in West Africa.

In 2013, Sasse College was awarded the pioneer prize of "Best School in Cameroon" by Fondation Terre d'accueil.

The motto of the school is Fides Quarens Intellectum meaning 'Faith seeking Understanding'.  a reference to the  philosophy of St. Augustine (354–430) and St. Anselm (c. 1033 – 1109) starting the life of a scholar is incomplete without first proceeding from a position of faith.

St Joseph’s College started timidly in Bonjongo, Buea, in 1937. The Mill Hill Missionaries later moved it to Sasse in 1939 as a Minor Seminary, where most of the students graduated and moved to the Major Seminary in Oweri, Nigeria.  Initially inaugurated with two dormitories only, a kitchen, a science laboratory and a handful of students, Sasse has grown in leaps and bounds. It has produced several priests, bishops and several other big names; the likes of former Prime Minister, Peter Mafany Musonge, Prof. Victor Anomah Ngu, Prof. Ephraim Ngwafor and so on.  The current Principal of the College, Rev. Fr. Aloysius Ndifor Ituka, said, “After Harvard, we can say Sasse is the goal. We are doing our best to keep the standards flying.”  Though a single sex education, it might be interesting to know that some ten women also passed through Sasse - Emerensia Besumbu Njume, now based in the US, attended Sasse in 1966. At the time, there was an attempt to transform the college into a co-educational institution. The attempt, however, botched and the girls were transferred to  Our Lady of Lourdes College, Bamenda and Queen of the Rosary College, Okoyong, Mamfe.

Houses 
St. Joseph's College, Sasse has nine houses all named after saints of the catholic church, which are;

 Saint Kizito
 Saint Aquinas
 Saint Paul
 Saint James
 Saint George
 Saint Peter
 Saint Augustine
 Saint Marinus
 Saint Martins

Principals and heads 
Sasse College has had 21 Principals, the first being Rev. Fr. Aloys Schgor. After the white Rev. Fathers sowed the seeds of the College, the black Rev. Fathers continued the forts. The first black Principal was Rev. Fr. Lucas Atang who later on became Monsignor Atang (of blessed memory). He took over from Rev. Father L. Flinn, in 1970. All the Principals have been Rev. Fathers except Mr. Ferdinand E. Ngando, who was Principal in 1977 to 1992. He handed over to Monsignor James Toba.

Sasse School Anthem 
Near the Buea Mountain

High above the sea,

Stands St. Joseph’s College

A place for you and me,

Tis here that we learn Biology

And Geometry and Chemistry.

O Sasse by the Mountain!

O Sasse by the Sea!

Time will come for the roll call,

Time for us to start!

Early in the morning

With strong and happy hearts.

I still feel the fragrance of the air,

The gardens fair and evening prayers!

O Sasse by the Mountain!

O Sasse by the Sea!

Marching in the study,

Going down to dine;

Resting in our billets

When bugle’s gone at nine.

We always remember Saturday nights,

The Sunday whites and Monday

bright!
O Sasse by the Mountain!

Sasse Old Boys 
Former students of St. Joseph's College, Sasse are known as Sobans.  The Sasse College Alumni association is known as Sasse Old Boys Association(SOBA). There are notable members of Cameroonian society that adhere to the Sasserian values and are extended an invitation to become members of Sasse Old Boys club. They generally known as Honorary Sobans.

See also

 Education in Cameroon

References

Boys' schools in Cameroon
Buea
Catholic secondary schools in Africa
Secondary schools in Cameroon
Educational institutions established in 1939
1939 establishments in British Cameroon